Kent Jeffrey Emanuel (born June 4, 1992) is an American professional baseball pitcher in the Pittsburgh Pirates organization. He played college baseball for the University of North Carolina at Chapel Hill and made his MLB debut with the Houston Astros in 2021.

Amateur career
Emanuel attended Woodstock High School in Woodstock, Georgia. He was drafted by the Pittsburgh Pirates in the 19th round of the 2010 MLB draft, but did not sign. Emanuel attended the University of North Carolina at Chapel Hill and played college baseball for the North Carolina Tar Heels. In 2011, he played collegiate summer baseball with the Falmouth Commodores of the Cape Cod Baseball League. In 2013, Emanuel was named the Atlantic Coast Conference Baseball Pitcher of the Year.

Professional career

Houston Astros
The Houston Astros selected Emanuel in the third round, with the 74th overall selection, of the 2013 MLB draft. He pitched 9 scoreless innings for the GCL Astros in 2013. He split the 2014 season between the Quad Cities River Bandits and the Lancaster JetHawks, going a combined 9–7 with a 4.21 ERA over 124 innings. He spent the 2015 season with the Corpus Christi Hooks, going 1–1 with a 3.68 ERA over  innings. He returned to Corpus Christi in 2016, going 6–4 with a 5.23 ERA over  innings. He split the 2017 season between Corpus Christi and the Fresno Grizzlies, going a combined 6–7 with a 5.72 ERA over 116 innings. He spent the 2018 season with Fresno, going 5–4 with a 5.59 ERA over  innings. Emanuel spent the 2019 season with the Round Rock Express of the Class AAA Pacific Coast League, going 8–2 with a 3.90 ERA over  innings.

The Astros added Emanuel to their 40-man roster on November 4, 2019. Emanuel did not play a minor league game in 2020 due to the cancellation of the minor league season caused by the COVID-19 pandemic. On August 6, 2020, he was suspended 80 games after testing positive for Dehydrochlormethyltestosterone.

On April 23, 2021, the Astros promoted Emanuel to the major leagues for the first time. In his MLB debut on April 24, he threw  innings in relief and picked up the win, becoming the first pitcher since Neil Allen in May 1988 to pitch more than eight innings in relief. He entered the game against the Los Angeles Angels at Minute Maid Park in relief of Jake Odorizzi who left the game due to tightness in his right forearm after retiring one batter on five pitches. On June 3, Emanuel underwent season-ending surgery to repair an injury to the ulnar collateral ligament in his left elbow. In 10 games for the Astros in 2021, he recorded a 2.55 ERA with 13 strikeouts.

Philadelphia Phillies
On November 19, 2021, the Philadelphia Phillies claimed Emanuel off of waivers. Emanuel was placed on the 60-day injured list to begin the 2022 season on March 20 with a left elbow impingement.

He elected free agency on November 10, 2022.

Pittsburgh Pirates
On February 10, 2023, Emanuel signed a minor league deal with the Pittsburgh Pirates.

References

External links

North Carolina Tar Heels bio

1992 births
Living people
American sportspeople in doping cases
Baseball players from Georgia (U.S. state)
Baseball players suspended for drug offenses
Corpus Christi Hooks players
Falmouth Commodores players
Fresno Grizzlies players
Gulf Coast Astros players
Houston Astros players
Lancaster JetHawks players
Major League Baseball pitchers
People from Woodstock, Georgia
North Carolina Tar Heels baseball players
Quad Cities River Bandits players
Round Rock Express players
Tigres del Licey players
American expatriate baseball players in the Dominican Republic